The Pryazovia Worker is a regional Russian-language newspaper in Ukraine.

History
The newspaper was founded on March 9, 1918, in Mariupol. At various times, it published under different names: Reports of the Mariupol Military Revolutionary Committee, Reports of the Revolutionary and Party Committee of Mariupol, Pryazovia Truth, Our Truth, and Pryazovia Proletarian. It began publishing under its current name on April 16, 1937.

Today
The newspaper is distribution throughout the south of the Donets Basin; it had the largest circulation in Donetsk oblast in 2010. It has its own printing, distribution network and shop. As of 2008 it had about 100 employees.

The newspaper is a subdivision of the company PJSC «Pryazovia Worker», which publishes other periodicals and runs an advertising agency. The beneficial owner of PJSC «Pryazovia Worker», holding 88.69% of shares, is SCM, the holding company of Rinat Akhmetov, the richest man in Ukraine.

References

External links
 Official website 
 Newspaper archives (since 2004) 
 Selected archival publications in 90 years 
 Rinat Akhmetov has concentrated 88.69% of "Pryazovia Worker" 
 SCM has increased its stake in the newspaper "Pryazovia Worker" from 78.55% to 88.69%  
 JSC "Pryazovia Worker" Newspaper" - among the better producer of newspapers! 

1918 establishments in Ukraine
Publications established in 1918
Russian-language newspapers published in Ukraine
Culture in Mariupol
History of Mariupol